The Best of Shawn Colvin is a compilation album by Shawn Colvin released on July 20, 2010.

Track listing
Never Saw Blue Like That
In the Bleak Mid-winter
Little Road to Bethlehem
Sunny Came Home
When the Rainbow Comes
Every Little Thing (He) Does Is Magic
One Cool Remove
If These Walls Could Speak
Get Out of This House
Steady On
Wichita Skyline
You and the Mona Lisa
A Matter of Minutes
Now the Day Is Over
Polaroids
Shotgun Down the Avalanche

References

2010 compilation albums
Shawn Colvin albums